is the sixth single by Japanese singer-songwriter Hideaki Tokunaga. Written by Tokunaga and Keiko Asō, the single was released through Apollon on October 25, 1988.

Background 
Tokunaga co-wrote "Saigo no Iiwake" after experiencing a painful breakup with someone he was dating at the time. As a result of the breakup, he involuntarily shed tears while performing the song on the TBS music show The Best Ten.

The song was used as the opening theme of the Kansai TV/Fuji TV drama series . It was also featured in the 1993 film Tora-san's Matchmaker.

The song is included in Tokunaga's compilation albums Single Collection (1986~1991) (1998),  Beautiful Ballade (2006), Singles Best (2008), Vocalist & Ballade Best (2011), and All Time Best Presence (2016). Tokunaga re-recorded the song in the albums Self Cover Best ~ Kagayaki Nagara~ (2003) and Eien no Hateni ~ Self Cover Best I ~ (2018).

Chart performance 
"Saigo no Iiwake" reached number 4 on Oricon's singles chart, number 100 on Oricon's 1988 year-ending chart and number 69 on Oricon's 1989 year-ending chart.

Track listing

Chart position

Cover versions
"Saigo no Iiwake" has been covered by Midori Karashima, Satoshi Furuya, Ruru Honda, and Junko Yamamoto.

Outside Japan, the song became popular in the Philippines, when it was covered by Ted Ito as "Ikaw Pa Rin", Keempee de Leon as "My One and Only", Maso as "Kailanman" in Tagalog and "Come Back Home" in English, and as an instrumental by saxophonist Jake Concepcion.

References

External links
 Official website
 
 

1988 singles
1988 songs
J-pop songs
Japanese-language songs